Parafroneta is a genus of South Pacific dwarf spiders that was first described by A. D. Blest in 1979.

Species
 it contains fourteen species:
Parafroneta ambigua Blest, 1979 – New Zealand
Parafroneta confusa Blest, 1979 – New Zealand
Parafroneta demota Blest & Vink, 2002 – New Zealand
Parafroneta haurokoae Blest & Vink, 2002 – New Zealand
Parafroneta hirsuta Blest & Vink, 2003 – New Zealand
Parafroneta insula Blest, 1979 – New Zealand
Parafroneta marrineri (Hogg, 1909) (type) – New Zealand (Campbell Is.)
Parafroneta minuta Blest, 1979 – New Zealand
Parafroneta monticola Blest, 1979 – New Zealand
Parafroneta persimilis Blest, 1979 – New Zealand
Parafroneta pilosa Blest & Vink, 2003 – New Zealand
Parafroneta subalpina Blest & Vink, 2002 – New Zealand
Parafroneta subantarctica Blest, 1979 – New Zealand
Parafroneta westlandica Blest & Vink, 2002 – New Zealand

See also
 List of Linyphiidae species (I–P)

References

Araneomorphae genera
Linyphiidae
Spiders of New Zealand